Eucalyptus smithii, commonly known as the gully gum, gully peppermint, blackbutt peppermint, or ironbark peppermint, is a species of medium-sized to tall tree, sometimes a mallee, that is endemic to southeastern Australia. It has rough, compact bark on the trunk, smooth ribbony bark above, narrow lance-shaped adult leaves, flower buds in groups of seven, white flowers and cup-shaped, bell-shaped or hemispherical fruit.

Description
The tree form has rough, fibrous, compact and dark grey-brown to black bark on the trunk. The bark on the branches and on the trunk and branches of mallees is smooth and white to cream-coloured. Upper branch bark is shed in long ribbons. Flowering occurs from December to January and the flowers are white.

Taxonomy and naming
Eucalyptus smithii was first formally described in 1899 by Richard Thomas Baker in Proceedings of the Linnean Society of New South Wales, from specimens collected by William Bäuerlen near Braidwood. The specific epithet (smithii) honours academic chemist Henry George Smith (1852 - 1954), for his pioneering work on essential oils of eucalypts and other Australian flora.

Distribution and habitat
Gully gum grows in shallow soils on sloping sites on the coast and tablelands south from Yerranderie in New South Wales to eastern Victoria where it occurs as a rough-barked tree in well-watered valleys or as a smooth-barked mallee on mountains.

Uses
The species is widely grown in southern Africa, and its leaves are used for the production of distilled eucalyptus oil.  The oil is high in cineole (75–84%).  E. smithii also shows some promise in the pulpwood industry.

Gallery

References

smithii
Trees of Australia
Flora of Victoria (Australia)
Flora of New South Wales
Myrtales of Australia
Plants described in 1899
Taxa named by Richard Thomas Baker